Assia Uhanany (born 1987) is an Israeli deaf model and beauty pageant contestant. On 29 September 2018, she was crowned as the Miss Deaf World 2018 which was held in Prague, Czech Republic. She also became the first Israeli to win the Miss Deaf World contest.

References 

Living people
Israeli female models
Deaf beauty pageant contestants
Israeli deaf people
Israeli beauty pageant winners
People from Tel Aviv
1987 births